Wojciechówka may refer to the following places:
Wojciechówka, Tomaszów Lubelski County in Lublin Voivodeship (east Poland)
Wojciechówka, Subcarpathian Voivodeship (south-east Poland)
Wojciechówka, Świętokrzyskie Voivodeship (south-central Poland)
Wojciechówka, Gmina Białobrzegi in Masovian Voivodeship (east-central Poland)
Wojciechówka, Gmina Promna in Masovian Voivodeship (east-central Poland)
Wojciechówka, Mińsk County in Masovian Voivodeship (east-central Poland)
Wojciechówka, Zwoleń County in Masovian Voivodeship (east-central Poland)
Wojciechówka, Greater Poland Voivodeship (west-central Poland)